The quaternary prevention, concept coined by the Belgian general practitioner Marc Jamoulle, are the actions taken to identify a patient at risk of overmedicalisation, to protect them from new medical invasion, and to suggest  interventions which are ethically acceptable.

Quaternary prevention is the set of health activities to mitigate or avoid the consequences of unnecessary or excessive intervention of the health system.

Explanation of term 
Marc Jamoulle divided medical situations into four quadrants based on if the patient was experiencing illness (i.e. if the patient experienced subjective poor health) and if the doctor had identified disease (constructed based on diagnostic criteria), with a different type of prevention happening in each:
 Primary prevention when both illness and disease are absent
 Secondary prevention when illness is absent but disease is present
 Tertiary prevention when both illness and disease are present
 Quaternary prevention when the patient is experiencing illness but there is no identified disease

Jamoulle noted that when the patient was experiencing illness but no specific disease had been identified that patient was particularly vulnerable to their condition being made worse by invasive or harmful diagnostic medical intervention.

This original explanation is more limited than the more general term listed in the Wonca International Dictionary for General/Family Practice, "action taken to identify patient at risk of overmedicalisation, to protect him from new medical invasion, and to suggest to him interventions, which are ethically acceptable".

See also 

 Bioethics
 Cascade effect
 Defensive medicine
 Iatrogenesis
 Medical ethics
 Medicalization
 Medicine
 Patient safety
 Preventive medicine

References

Further reading 
 Gofrit ON, Shemer J, Leibovici D, Modan B, Shapira SC. Quaternary prevention: a new look at an old challenge. Isr Med Assoc J. 2000;2(7):498-500.
  Ortún V. Gestión clínica y sanitaria. De la práctica diaria a la academia, ida y vuelta. Barcelona: Elsevier/Masson; 2003. p.245
 UEMO, European Union of General Practitioners / Family Physicians, Santiago LM. Quaternary prevention. Document 2008/040, October 2008.
 Gérvas J, Starfield B, Heath I. Is clinical prevention better than cure? Lancet. 2008;372:1997-99.
 Marc Jamoulle. Paradigm shift in Primary Care working fields. 11th congress of SBMFC, Brazilia, June 2011.
  Marc Jamoulle. la prévention quaternaire, une tâche explicite du médecin généraliste. Prospective Jeunesse. 2012; 7–11.
 Julien Nève, Marc Jamoulle. Quaternary prevention, an explicit task of the physician. Oct 25, 2012.
  Gérvas J. Prevención cuaternaria en ancianos. Rev Esp Geriatr Gerontol. 2012; 47(6):266-9.
  Quaternary Prevention (P4). Revista Brasileira de Medicina de Família e Comunidade. 2015; 10(35).

Evidence-based medicine
Health care quality
Medical ethics
Medical terminology
Medical treatments
Patient safety
Preventive medicine